was a Japanese actor.

Filmography

Film
 Assassination (1964)
 Kyu-chan no Dekkai Yume (1967)
 Mito Kōmon (1978)
  Shōsetsu Yoshida gakkō (1983) - Eisaku Satō

Television
 Ōoka Echizen (1970-2006) - Sakakibara Iori
 Kunitori Monogatari (1973) - Ashikaga Yoshiteru
 Fujin no Mon (1980) - Sanada Yukimura
 Sekigahara (1981) - Hosokawa Tadaoki
 Miyamoto Musashi (1984–85) - Yagyū Munenori

References

1944 births
2011 deaths
Japanese male actors
Actors from Chiba Prefecture